The 1970 World 600 the 11th running of the event, was a NASCAR Grand National Series race held on May 24, 1970 at Charlotte Motor Speedway in Concord, North Carolina. Contested over 400 laps on the 1.5 mile (2.42 km) speedway, it was the 16th race of the 1970 NASCAR Grand National Series. Donnie Allison won the race.

Bugs Stevens made his official NASCAR debut in this race.

Background
The race was held at Charlotte Motor Speedway, a  quad-oval track located in Concord, North Carolina. The track's turns were banked at twenty-four degrees, while the front stretch, the location of the finish line, was five degrees. The back stretch, opposite of the front, also had a five degree banking. Charlotte Motor Speedway hosted the NASCAR Grand National Series twice during the 1970 season, with the other race being the National 500. The track opened for the inaugural World 600 in 1960, and was built by Bruton Smith and Curtis Turner. An estimated 70,000 spectators attended the race.

Top 10 results

Race Statistics
 Time of race: 4:37:36
 Average Speed: 
 Pole Speed: 
 Cautions: 10 for 66 laps
 Margin of Victory: 2 laps +
 Lead changes: 28

References

World 600
World 600
NASCAR races at Charlotte Motor Speedway